National Tertiary Route 622, or just Route 622 (or ) is a National Road Route of Costa Rica, located in the Puntarenas province.

Description
In Puntarenas province the route covers Esparza canton (Espíritu Santo, San Juan Grande, Caldera districts).

References

Highways in Costa Rica